The Broadcast/Multicast control (BMC) is a sublayer of layer 2 protocol of Radio Interface Protocol Architecture as per BMC-STD. It exists in the user plane only. It is located above the Radio Link Control (RLC), a layer 2 responsible for mapping logical channels. It is similar to 802.11's LLC layer which supports multimode operations and it works in three different modes:
 a) Transparent 
 b) Unacknowledged data transfer 
 c) Acknowledged data transfer. Its main function is to deliver "Cell Broadcast" messages to its upper layer such as NAS.

Other functions specified in [3GPP TS 25.301] are:
 Storage of Cell Broadcast Messages.
 Traffic volume monitoring and radio resource request for CBS.
 Scheduling of BMC messages.
 Transmission of BMC messages to UE.
 Delivery of Cell Broadcast messages to upper layer (NAS).

Except for broadcast/multicast it operates in transparent mode as per [BMC-STD]. On the uplink BMC it requires Unacknowledged mode of data transfer from RLC.

References 
 [BMC-STD] 3GPP TS 25.324 V8.0.0 (2007–12); 3rd Generation Partnership Project; Technical Specification Group Radio Access Network; Broadcast/Multicast Control BMC;

Broadcasting